The George E. Goodman Mansion, at 1120 Oak St. in Napa, California, was built in 1873.  It was listed on the National Register of Historic Places in 1993.

It was designed by architects McDougall and Marquis of San Francisco in Second Empire style.

References

External links

National Register of Historic Places in Napa County, California
Second Empire architecture in California
Houses completed in 1873